Dolerothera is a genus of moths belonging to the family Tineidae.

Species
Dolerothera amphiplecta Meyrick, 1918
Dolerothera theodora Meyrick, 1926

References

Tineidae
Tineidae genera
Taxa named by Edward Meyrick